The Los Angeles Kings are an American professional ice hockey team based in Los Angeles, California. They play in the Pacific Division of the Western Conference in the National Hockey League (NHL). The team joined the NHL in 1967 as an expansion team with five other teams, and won their first Stanley Cup in 2012. Having first played at The Forum, the Kings have played their home games at the Staples Center since 1999. The Kings are owned by Philip Anschutz and Edward P. Roski, Rob Blake is their general manager, and Anže Kopitar is the team captain.

There have been 25 head coaches for the Kings. The franchise's first head coach was Red Kelly, who coached for two seasons. Andy Murray is the franchise's all-time leader for the most regular-season games coached (480), the most regular-season game wins (215), and the most regular-season points (519); Darryl Sutter is the franchise's all-time leader for the most playoff games coached (64) and playoff game wins (41), and the highest playoff winning percentage (.641), which is one of only two over .500 out of the Kings' head coaches. Rogatien Vachon, who coached the Kings for three non-consecutive stints, is the Kings' all-time leader for the least regular-season games coached, with 10. Bob Pulford is the only head coach to have been awarded the Jack Adams Award with the Kings, having won it in the 1974–75 season. Larry Regan and Don Perry have spent their entire NHL head coaching careers with the Kings. Roger Neilson, who coached the Kings for 28 games, is the only Kings head coach to have been elected to the Hockey Hall of Fame as a builder. Darryl Sutter was the Kings Head Coach from 2011-2017.

Key

Coaches

Note: Statistics are correct through the end of the 2018-19 season.

Notes
 A running total of the number of coaches of the Kings. Thus, any coach who has two or more separate terms as head coach is only counted once.
 Before the 2005–06 season, the NHL instituted a penalty shootout for regular season games that remained tied after a five-minute overtime period, which prevented ties.
 Each year is linked to an article about that particular NHL season.

References

General

Specific

 
Los Angeles Kings head coaches
head coaches